"As the Days Go By" is a song written by Ian Thomas and recorded by Australian singer Daryl Braithwaite as the first single from his second studio album, Edge, in 1988. It features singer John Farnham as a backing vocalist in the chorus.

The track is one of Braithwaite's most popular recordings, and was included on his compilation albums The Essential Daryl Braithwaite (2007) and Days Go By (2017). An extended mix features in the 1994 compilation album Six Moons: The Best of Daryl Braithwaite 1988–1994 and an acoustic version opens the 2008 live album The Lemon Tree. The song was also included on the soundtrack to the 1992 British comedy film Peter's Friends.

Track listing
CD single (1988)
 "As The Days Go By" – 4:04	
 "In My Life" – 5:07

Personnel 

 Daryl Braithwaite – vocals
 Andy Cichon – bass
 Jef Scott – guitars, keyboards, backing vocals, additional drumming
 Simon Hussey – keyboards, drum machine, producer
 John Farnham – backing vocals

Charts

Weekly charts

Year-end charts

References

External links 

 'Daryl Braithwaite - As The Days Go By' Music Video on YouTube / (C) 1988 Sony Music Entertainment (Australia) Ltd.

1988 songs
1988 singles
Songs written by Ian Thomas (Canadian musician)
CBS Records singles
Song recordings produced by Simon Hussey